The 2008 Cincinnati Bengals season was the franchise's 39th season in the National Football League, the 41st overall, and the 6th under head coach Marvin Lewis.  The team finished the season with 4 wins, 11 losses, and 1 tie, and missing out of the playoffs for the 3rd consecutive year.

Offseason

Coaching changes
This season marked head coach Marvin Lewis's sixth year with the Bengals. His offensive coordinator, Bob Bratkowski, remained with the team, but his defensive coordinator from 2007 to 2008, Chuck Bresnahan, was not retained. He was replaced by Mike Zimmer and Jeff FitzGerald replaced Ricky Hunley as linebacker coach.

Season theme
Typically Lewis has had a theme for the upcoming season for the team to rally around. For the 2008 season it was "Now"

Departures

 Madieu Williams, Safety signed with the Minnesota Vikings.
 Justin Smith, Defensive end signed with the San Francisco 49ers.
 Landon Johnson, Linebacker signed with the Carolina Panthers.
 Willie Anderson, the long time Offensive Lineman was released and signed by the division rival Baltimore Ravens.
 Rudi Johnson was released and signed by the Detroit Lions.
 Ahmad Brooks, Linebacker, who was allegedly involved in an assault for punching a woman in the face late April, was released before the season began.
 David Pollack, who was injured during his second season in the NFL with the Bengals and suffered paralysis, declined to return to football and officially retired.
 Chris Henry was released from the team on the same day a press release in the local paper announced his alleged involvement in an assault occurring within Cincinnati. A few weeks after Marvin Lewis made the public declaration that Henry would never play for the Bengals again he was re-signed. He was ineligible to play the first 4 regular season games as punishment for his involvement with criminal charges against him which were dropped before his reinstatement.
 Odell Thurman, a linebacker suspended for two consecutive years, was declared eligible to return to the NFL. He was then waived in May when Lewis cited that they had not seen enough of Odell to evaluate him properly. Less than a month later Odell was indefinitely suspended from the NFL for violating their substance abuse policy.

Signings
 Ben Utecht, a tight end previously with the Indianapolis Colts
 Antwan Odom, a defensive end previously with the Tennessee Titans
 Doug Gabriel, a wide receiver previously with the Oakland Raiders. He was released from the Bengals on May 29, 2008.

NFL Draft

The Bengals gained an additional four picks for compensation of losing certain players.

Roster

Schedule

Preseason

Regular season

Note: Intra-division opponents are in bold text.

Standings

Regular season results

Week 1: at Baltimore Ravens

Starter, Dexter Jackson, was inactive due to injury.

The Bengals began their 2008 campaign on the road against their AFC North foe, the Baltimore Ravens.  In the first quarter, Cincinnati trailed early as Ravens WR Mark Clayton turned a double reverse play into a 42-yard TD run.  In the second quarter, the Bengals continued to struggle as kicker Matt Stover gave Baltimore a 21-yard field goal.  Cincinnati would reply as kicker Shayne Graham nailed a 43-yard field goal.  However, in the third quarter, the Bengals continued to show their dismal defense as Ravens QB Joe Flacco got a 38-yard TD run.  In the fourth quarter, the Bengals tried to rally as CB Johnathan Joseph returned a fumble 65 yards for a touchdown.  However, Baltimore's defense stiffened and held on for the win.

With the loss, Cincinnati began their season at 0–1.  It became the team's first regular season opening loss since 2004.

Week 2: vs. Tennessee Titans

Starter Dexter Jackson was inactive for the game due to injury.

Hoping to rebound from their divisional road loss to the Ravens, the Bengals played their Week 2 home opener against the Tennessee Titans. At the beginning of the game the winds were marked at 20 mph and picked up intensity as the game continued, with gusts to hurricane force at times due to the passage of the remnants of Hurricane Ike. After a scoreless first quarter, Cincinnati trailed as Titans RB LenDale White got a 1-yard TD run.  The Bengals would respond with RB Chris Perry getting his first career TD on a 13-yard run.  However, Tennessee would begin its domination with QB Kerry Collins completing an 11-yard TD pass to WR Justin Gage.  In the third quarter, Cincinnati continued to struggle as kicker Rob Bironas nailed a 34-yard field goal.  In the fourth quarter, the Titans sealed the win with LB Keith Bulluck blocking and recovering a punt within Cincy's endzone for a touchdown.

During the game, the wind was such a factor that it aided the Titan's punter who, with a quick 1-step drop, kicked a punt travelling 70 yards past scrimmage before hitting the ground. It appeared to contribute to difficulties with short passes and long snaps.

With the loss, the Bengals fell to 0–2.  It became the team's first 0-2 start since 2003.

Week 3: at New York Giants

Starters Ben Utecht, Johnathan Joseph, & Dexter Jackson, were inactive for the game due to injuries.

Trying to snap their two-game losing skid, the Bengals flew to Giants Stadium for a Week 3 matchup with the defending Super Bowl champions, the New York Giants.  In the first quarter, Cincinnati scratched first with kicker Shayne Graham getting a 22-yard field goal.  In the second quarter, the Giants responded with RB Brandon Jacobs getting a 1-yard TD run.  The Bengals would strike back with RB Chris Perry getting a 25-yard TD run.  New York tied the game with kicker John Carney getting a 24-yard field goal, yet Cincinnati would close out the half with Graham's 30-yard field goal.

In the third quarter, the Giants would tie the game with Carney kicking a 46-yard field goal.  In the fourth quarter, New York would take the lead with Carney's 26-yard field goal.  The Bengals would reclaim its lead with QB Carson Palmer completing a 17-yard TD pass to WR T.J. Houshmandzadeh.  The Giants responded with QB Eli Manning completing a 4-yard TD pass to TE Kevin Boss, yet Cincinnati tied the game with Graham's 21-yard field goal.  However, in overtime, New York came out on top as Carney nailing the game-winning 22-yard field goal.

With the loss, the Bengals fell to 0–3 as they prepared to face the Cleveland Browns the next game who were also 0–3.  This was the team's first 0-3 start since 2003.

Week 4: vs. Cleveland Browns 

Still searching for their first win, the Bengals went home for a Week 4 AFC North duel with the Cleveland Browns in Round 1 of 2008's Battle of Ohio.  With QB Carson Palmer out with a sore right elbow, back-up QB Ryan Fitzpatrick was named the starter.

In the first quarter, Cincinnati trailed early as Browns kicker Phil Dawson got a 25-yard field goal.  In the second quarter, the Bengals took the lead with kicker Shayne Graham getting a 42-yard and a 45-yard field goal.  After a scoreless third quarter, Cleveland regained the lead in the fourth quarter with QB Derek Anderson completing a 4-yard TD pass to WR Braylon Edwards, along with RB Jamal Lewis getting a 1-yard TD run.  Cincinnati would respond with Fitzpatrick completing a 4-yard TD pass to WR Chad Ocho Cinco, yet the Browns pulled away with Dawson nailing a 29-yard field goal.

With yet another loss, the Bengals fell to 0–4 for the first time since 2002, while the Browns improved to 1–3.

Week 5: at Dallas Cowboys

Still searching for their first win, the Bengals flew to Texas Stadium for a Week 5 interconference duel with the Dallas Cowboys.  In the first quarter, Cincinnati trailed early as Cowboys kicker Nick Folk got a 30-yard field goal, along with RB Felix Jones getting a 33-yard TD run.  In the second quarter, Dallas increased its lead as QB Tony Romo completed a 4-yard TD pass to TE Jason Witten.  The Bengals would end the half with kicker Shayne Graham getting a 41-yard and a 31-yard field goal.

In the third quarter, Cincinnati tried to rally as QB Carson Palmer completed an 18-yard TD pass to WR T. J. Houshmandzadeh.  In the fourth quarter, the Bengals got closer as Graham got a 40-yard field goal, yet the Cowboys answered with Romo completing a 57-yard TD pass to WR Terrell Owens.  Cincinnati tried to come back as Palmer completed a 10-yard TD pass to Houshmandzadeh (with a failed 2-point conversion), but Dallas pulled away with Romo completing a 15-yard TD pass to WR Patrick Crayton.

With the loss, the Bengals fell to 0–5.

Week 6: at New York Jets

Still looking for their first win, the Bengals flew to The Meadowlands for a Week 6 duel with the throwback-clad New York Jets.  With QB Carson Palmer out again nursing an injured elbow, QB Ryan Fitzpatrick was again named the starter.

In the first quarter, Cincinnati pounced first as strong safety Chinedum Ndukwe returned a fumble 15 yards for a touchdown.  The Jets responded with QB Brett Favre completing a 2-yard TD pass to RB Thomas Jones.  In the second quarter, New York took the lead as kicker Jay Feely got a 38-yard field goal, while Jones got a 7-yard TD run.  The Bengals closed out the half with Fitzpatrick getting a 1-yard TD run.

In the third quarter, the Jets began to pull away as Feely got a 43-yard field goal.  In the fourth quarter, New York sealed the win as Jones got a 1-yard TD run (with a failed 2-point conversion).

With the loss, Cincinnati fell to 0–6 and it became their first 0–6 start as well as 6-game losing streak since 2002.

Week 7: vs. Pittsburgh Steelers

Still searching for their first win of the season, the Bengals went home for a Week 7 AFC North duel with the Pittsburgh Steelers.  With Carson Palmer still out with a sore elbow, QB Ryan Fitzpatrick was given the start.

In the first quarter, Cincinnati trailed early as Steelers QB Ben Roethlisberger completed a 2-yard TD pass to RB Mewelde Moore, along with kicker Jeff Reed getting a 21-yard field goal.  In the second quarter, the Bengals answered with Fitzpatrick completing a 5-yard TD pass to WR Chad Ocho Cinco.  In the third quarter, Pittsburgh responded with Moore getting a 13-yard TD run.  Cincinnati would respond with kicker Dave Rayner nailing a 26-yard field goal.  However, in the fourth quarter, the Steelers pulled away with Roethlisberger completing a 50-yard TD pass to WR Nate Washington, Moore getting a 2-yard TD run, and QB Byron Leftwich completing a 16-yard TD pass to WR Hines Ward.  Earlier in the game, Ward destroyed Bengals linebacker Keith Rivers with a vicious then-legal hit, breaking Rivers' jaw. NFL rules were changed after the season to make similar hits illegal in the future.

With the loss, Cincinnati dropped to 0–7.  The team's first such start since 2002.

Week 8: at Houston Texans

Still trying to acquire their first win of the season, the Bengals flew to Reliant Stadium for a Week 8 duel with the Houston Texans.  In the first quarter, Cincinnati's struggles continued as Texans WR Jacoby Jones returned a punt 73 yards for a touchdown.  The Bengals responded with kicker Shayne Graham getting a 43-yard field goal.  In the second quarter, Houston increased its lead as QB Matt Schaub completed a 6-yard TD pass to WR David Anderson.  Cincinnati closed out the half with Graham nailing a 32-yard field goal.

In the third quarter, the Texans began to pull away as Schaub completed a 7-yard and a 39-yard TD pass to WR Kevin Walter.  In the fourth quarter, Houston sealed the win with RB Steve Slaton getting a 20-yard TD run.

With yet another loss, the Bengals would fall to 0–8 and start a season with such a record for the first time since 1994.

Week 9: vs. Jacksonville Jaguars

Still looking for their first win of the season, the Bengals went home, donned their alternate uniforms, and played a Week 9 duel with the Jacksonville Jaguars.  In the first quarter, Cincinnati clawed first as QB Ryan Fitzpatrick completed a 2-yard TD pass to WR Chad Ocho Cinco.  In the second quarter, the Bengals increased their lead as Fitzpatrick hooked up with Ocho Cinco again on a 10-yard TD pass.  The Jaguars would end the half on kicker Josh Scobee's 52-yard field goal.

In the third quarter, Cincinnati continued its hot streak as RB Cedric Benson got a 7-yard TD run.  In the fourth quarter, Jacksonville began to rally as Scobee nailed a 26-yard field goal, FB Montell Owens returned the fumbled kickoff 18 yards for a touchdown, and RB Maurice Jones-Drew got a 1-yard TD pass.  Fortunately, the Bengals' defense prevented the Jaguars from getting the 2-point conversion, allowing Cincinnati to finally get its first win of the season.

With the win, not only did the Bengals go into their bye week at 1–8, the win also made the Lions the only winless NFL team (the same Lions that would go 0–16).

Week 11: vs. Philadelphia Eagles

Coming off their bye week, the Bengals stayed at home for a Week 11 interconference duel with the Philadelphia Eagles.  After a scoreless first quarter, Cincinnati pounced as kicker Shayne Graham got a 20-yard field goal.  The Eagles responded as kicker David Akers got a 42-yard field goal.  The Bengals would close out the half as QB Ryan Fitzpatrick completed a 26-yard TD pass to WR T.J. Houshmandzadeh.

In the third quarter, Cincinnati increased their lead as Graham got a 41-yard field goal.  Philadelphia answered with QB Donovan McNabb completing a 4-yard TD pass to TE L.J. Smith.  In the fourth quarter, the Eagles tied the game with Aker nailing a 27-yard field goal.  In overtime, both teams had opportunities for game-winning scores, yet both defenses kept them down.

With the tie, the Bengals improved to 1–8–1.

This was the first game to end in a tie in the NFL since 2002, when the Atlanta Falcons played the Pittsburgh Steelers to a 34–34 tie. At the post-game press conference, Eagles quarterback Donovan McNabb famously stated that he didn't know games could end tied. A minor controversy arose from this, claiming that the Eagles could have changed their overtime strategy had McNabb known about ties.

Week 12: at Pittsburgh Steelers

Coming off their tie with the Eagles, the Bengals flew to Heinz Field for a Week 12 AFC North rematch with the Pittsburgh Steelers on Thursday Night Football.  Prior to the game, it was announced that due to arriving at a team meeting 45 minutes late and arguing with head coach Marvin Lewis, WR Chad Ocho Cinco was deactivated for the game.

In the first quarter, Cincinnati struck first as QB Ryan Fitzpatrick completed a 10-yard TD pass to WR Glenn Holt.  In the second quarter, the Steelers took the lead as QB Ben Roethlisberger completed a 3-yard TD pass to TE Heath Miller, along with kicker Jeff Reed getting a 37-yard field goal.  In the third quarter, Pittsburgh increased its lead as Reed made a 38-yard field goal, along with RB Gary Russell getting a 2-yard TD run.  In the fourth quarter, the Bengals tried to rally as kicker Shayne Graham nailed a 26-yard field goal.  However, the Steelers pulled away with Roethlisberger's 8-yard TD run.

With the loss, Cincinnati fell to 1–9–1. It was also the Bengals' 332nd loss since the originating of the AFC-NFC format in 1970, temporarily tying them with the New York Jets for the most all-time losses among AFC teams.

Week 13: vs. Baltimore Ravens

Hoping to rebound from their road loss to the Steelers, the Bengals went home for a Week 13 AFC North rematch with the Baltimore Ravens.  In the first quarter, Cincinnati trailed early as Ravens kicker Matt Stover made a 27-yard field goal.  In the second quarter, Baltimore increased its lead as Stover got a 21-yard field goal, along with QB Joe Flacco completing a 4-yard TD pass to TE Todd Heap.  The Bengals would close out the half as kicker Shayne Graham nailed a 21-yard field goal.

In the third quarter, the Ravens pulled away as WR Mark Clayton completed a 32-yard TD pass to WR Derrick Mason and caught a 70-yard TD pass from Flacco.  In the fourth quarter, Baltimore pulled away as safety Jim Leonhard returned an interception 35 yards for a touchdown.

With the loss, not only did Cincinnati fall to 1–10–1.  They surpassed their 2007 loss total and were swept by the Ravens for the first time since 2002.

Week 14: at Indianapolis Colts 

Trying to rebound from back-to-back divisional losses, the Bengals flew to Lucas Oil Stadium for a Week 14 duel with the Indianapolis Colts.  In the first quarter, Cincinnati trailed as Colts RB Dominic Rhodes got a 17-yard TD run.  The Bengals would answer in the second quarter as kicker Shayne Graham nailed a 19-yard field goal, but Indianapolis answered right back with QB Peyton Manning completing a 5-yard touchdown pass to wide receiver Marvin Harrison.  Manning would help the Colts pull away in the third quarter with a 2-yard touchdown pass to wide receiver Anthony Gonzalez and a 4-yard touchdown pass to TE Dallas Clark.  Indianapolis would seal the game in the fourth quarter as CB Kelvin Hayden returned an interception 85 yards for a touchdown.

With the loss, Cincinnati fell to 1–11–1.

Week 15 vs. Redskins

Week 16: at Cleveland Browns

Coming off their home win over the Redskins, the Bengals flew to Cleveland Browns Stadium for Round 2 of 2008's Battle of Ohio with the Cleveland Browns.  Cincinnati would get the lead in the first quarter as cornerback Leon Hall returned an interception 50 yards for a touchdown which was his first interception of the year. Hall also intercepted two other passes giving him 3 total in the game. RB Cedric Benson carried the ball for a career-high 38 times for a career-high 171 yards.  The Bengals would then add onto their lead in the second quarter as quarterback Ryan Fitzpatrick completed a 20-yard touchdown pass to wide receiver Chris Henry.  From there on out, the defense prevented Cleveland from getting any kind of momentum.

With the win, the Bengals improved to 3–11–1.

Week 17: vs. Kansas City Chiefs

Coming off their divisional road win over the Browns, the Bengals went home, donned their alternate uniforms again, and closed out their season with a Week 17 duel with the Kansas City Chiefs.  Cincinnati would get the first punch in the first quarter as kicker Shayne Graham got a 38-yard field goal.  In the second quarter, the Bengals would increase their lead as running back Cedric Benson got a 2-yard touchdown run, followed by Graham's 30-yard field goal.  After a scoreless third quarter, Cincinnati wrapped up its dominating day with Graham's 43-yard field goal.  The Chiefs would respond with quarterback Tyler Thigpen completing a 5-yard touchdown pass to tight end Tony Gonzalez (with a failed 2-point conversion).

With the win, the Bengals finished their season at 4–11–1.

Notes

References

External links

 ""Now" by Geoff Hobson on May 21, 2008"

Cincinnati Bengals seasons
Cin
Cincin